Rozynsk Wielki may refer to the following places in Poland:
Rożyńsk Wielki, Gołdap County
Różyńsk Wielki Ełk County